André Thomkins (Lucerne, 11 August 1930 - Berlin, 8 November 1985) was a Swiss painter, illustrator, and poet. From 1952, he lived in Germany and taught at the Kunstakademie Düsseldorf between 1971 and 1973.

Thomkins painted and drew ironic and fantastic pictures influenced by surrealism and dadaism. Together with Dieter Roth and Daniel Spoerri he prepared works of Eat Art. He also was a writer of palindromes. He died in 1985.

20th-century Swiss painters
Swiss male painters
1930 births
1985 deaths
20th-century poets
Swiss contemporary artists
20th-century Swiss male artists